The 1969–70 Los Angeles Kings season was the third ever for the Los Angeles Kings in the National Hockey League.  After qualifying for the playoffs in each of their first two seasons, under the direction of coach Red Kelly (who left to take the Pittsburgh job), the Kings finished the season with an NHL-worst record of 14-52-10 (38 points). The team also fired coach Hal Laycoe after just 24 games.  His replacement, Johnny Wilson, did not fare much better, winning just nine of the remaining 52 games on the schedule.

Offseason
In the Entry Draft, the Kings chose goaltender Dale Hoganson with their first pick, 16th overall in the second round.

Regular season

The Kings endured some long stretches of futility during the 1969–70 season:
From January 29 through March 5, they went 17 straight games without a victory (0–13–4)
From November 8 through November 29, they went 10 straight games without a victory (0–9–1)
From January 11 through January 25, and again from January 29 through February 15, they lost 8 straight games
From January 11 through February 15, they suffered 11 consecutive road losses.
Their only two victories away from home all season were: December 2 (4–3 at Oakland) and January 10 (6–4 at Minnesota)

Season standings

Schedule and results

|- align="center"
| 1 || 11 || Montreal Canadiens || 1–5  || Montreal || 0–1–0
|- align="center"
| 2 || 15 || St. Louis Blues || 1–4 || St. Louis || 0–2–0
|- align="center"
| 3 || 17 || Oakland Seals || 1–5 || Oakland || 0–3–0
|- align="center"
| 4 || 18 || Oakland Seals || 5–0 || Los Angeles || 1–3-0
|- align="center"
| 5 || 22 || Pittsburgh Penguins || 2–0 || Los Angeles || 2–3-0
|- align="center"
| 6 || 25 || Boston Bruins || 2–3 || Los Angeles || 2–4–0
|- align="center"
| 7 || 29 || Detroit Red Wings || 2–5 || Los Angeles || 2–5–0
|-

|- align="center"
| 8 || 1 || Chicago Black Hawks || 1–4 || Los Angeles || 2–6–0
|- align="center"
| 9 || 5 || Toronto Maple Leafs || 6–2 || Los Angeles || 3–6-0
|- align="center"
| 10 || 8 || New York Rangers || 1–4 || Los Angeles || 3–7–0
|- align="center"
| 11 || 10 || Montreal Canadiens || 3–6 || Los Angeles || 3–8–0
|- align="center"
| 12 || 15 || Pittsburgh Penguins || 1–3 || Pittsburgh || 3–9–0
|- align="center"
| 13 || 16 || Boston Bruins || 4–7 || Boston || 3–10–0
|- align="center"
| 14 || 19 || Toronto Maple Leafs || 4–4 || Toronto || 3-10–1
|- align="center"
| 15 || 20 || Philadelphia Flyers || 2–3 || Philadelphia || 3–11–1
|- align="center"
| 16 || 22 || Minnesota North Stars || 1–4 || Minnesota || 3–12–1
|- align="center"
| 17 || 26 || Chicago Black Hawks || 0–6 || Chicago || 3–13–1
|- align="center"
| 18 || 27 || Detroit Red Wings || 1–5 || Detroit || 3–14–1
|- align="center"
| 19 || 29 || St. Louis Blues || 1–3 || St. Louis || 3–15–1
|-

|- align="center"
| 20 || 2 || Oakland Seals || 4–3 || Oakland || 4–15-1
|- align="center"
| 21 || 3 || Philadelphia Flyers || 1–7 || Los Angeles || 4–16–1
|- align="center"
| 22 || 6 || Oakland Seals || 5–3 || Los Angeles || 5–16-1
|- align="center"
| 23 || 10 || Pittsburgh Penguins || 0–2 || Los Angeles || 5–17–1
|- align="center"
| 24 || 13 || St. Louis Blues || 1–8 || Los Angeles || 5–18–1
|- align="center"
| 25 || 15 || Minnesota North Stars || 4–4 || Los Angeles || 5-182
|- align="center"
| 26 || 17 || Chicago Black Hawks || 3–1 || Los Angeles || 6–18-2
|- align="center"
| 27 || 20 || Minnesota North Stars || 3–3 || Los Angeles || 6-18–3
|- align="center"
| 28 || 24 || Toronto Maple Leafs || 1–8 || Toronto || 6–19–3
|- align="center"
| 29 || 25 || Boston Bruins || 1–7 || Boston || 6–20–3
|- align="center"
| 30 || 28 || New York Rangers || 3–3 || New York || 6-20–4
|- align="center"
| 31 || 30 || Minnesota North Stars || 0–0 || Los Angeles || 6-205
|-

|- align="center"
| 32 || 1 || Philadelphia Flyers || 4–3 || Los Angeles || 7–20-5
|- align="center"
| 33 || 3 || Boston Bruins || 2–6 || Los Angeles || 7–21–5
|- align="center"
| 34 || 6 || Montreal Canadiens || 3–4 || Montreal || 7–22–5
|- align="center"
| 35 || 8 || Philadelphia Flyers || 1–4 || Philadelphia || 7–23–5
|- align="center"
| 36 || 10 || Minnesota North Stars || 6–4 || Minnesota || 8–23-5
|- align="center"
| 37 || 11 || Chicago Black Hawks || 1–3 || Chicago || 8–24–5
|- align="center"
| 38 || 14 || Montreal Canadiens || 2–4 || Montreal || 8–25–5
|- align="center"
| 39 || 15 || Boston Bruins || 3–6 || Boston || 8–26–5
|- align="center"
| 40 || 17 || St. Louis Blues || 1–3 || St. Louis || 8–27–5
|- align="center"
| 41 || 18 || Detroit Red Wings || 1–3 || Detroit || 8–28–5
|- align="center"
| 42 || 22 || Toronto Maple Leafs || 2–3 || Los Angeles || 8–29–5
|- align="center"
| 43 || 24 || Pittsburgh Penguins || 2–4 || Pittsburgh || 8–30–5
|- align="center"
| 44 || 25 || New York Rangers || 2–3 || New York || 8–31–5
|- align="center"
| 45 || 28 || New York Rangers || 5–4 || Los Angeles || 9–31-5
|- align="center"
| 46 || 29 || St. Louis Blues || 2–3 || Los Angeles || 9–32–5
|- align="center"
| 47 || 31 || Detroit Red Wings || 1–2 || Los Angeles || 9–33–5
|-

|- align="center"
| 48 || 5 || Montreal Canadiens || 3–5 || Los Angeles || 9–34–5
|- align="center"
| 49 || 7 || Pittsburgh Penguins || 1–3 || Pittsburgh || 9–35–5
|- align="center"
| 50 || 8 || New York Rangers || 1–5 || New York || 9–36–5
|- align="center"
| 51 || 11 || New York Rangers || 2–6 || Los Angeles || 9–37–5
|- align="center"
| 52 || 14 || St. Louis Blues || 1–2 || St. Louis || 9–38–5
|- align="center"
| 53 || 15 || Philadelphia Flyers || 1–7 || Philadelphia || 9–39–5
|- align="center"
| 54 || 18 || Boston Bruins || 5–5 || Los Angeles || 9-39–6
|- align="center"
| 55 || 19 || Pittsburgh Penguins || 1–6 || Los Angeles || 9–40–6
|- align="center"
| 56 || 21 || St. Louis Blues || 2–4 || Los Angeles || 9–41–6
|- align="center"
| 57 || 25 || Minnesota North Stars || 3–3 || Minnesota || 9-41–7
|- align="center"
| 58 || 26 || Pittsburgh Penguins || 0–1 || Pittsburgh || 9–42–7
|- align="center"
| 59 || 28 || Toronto Maple Leafs || 3–3 || Toronto || 9-42–8
|-

|- align="center"
| 60 || 1 || Philadelphia Flyers || 4–4 || Philadelphia || 9-42–9
|- align="center"
| 61 || 3 || Chicago Black Hawks || 1–3 || Los Angeles || 9–43–9
|- align="center"
| 62 || 5 || Toronto Maple Leafs || 3–5 || Los Angeles || 9–44–9
|- align="center"
| 63 || 7 || Oakland Seals || 5–3 || Los Angeles || 10–44-9
|- align="center"
| 64 || 8 || Oakland Seals || 2–2 || Oakland || 10-44–10
|- align="center"
| 65 || 12 || Pittsburgh Penguins || 4–1 || Los Angeles || 11–44-10
|- align="center"
| 66 || 14 || Philadelphia Flyers || 3–5 || Los Angeles || 11–45–10
|- align="center"
| 67 || 15 || Chicago Black Hawks || 2–5 || Chicago || 11–46–10
|- align="center"
| 68 || 17 || Detroit Red Wings || 2–3 || Detroit || 11–47–10
|- align="center"
| 69 || 19 || Montreal Canadiens || 1–6 || Los Angeles || 11–48–10
|- align="center"
| 70 || 21 || Detroit Red Wings || 1–4 || Los Angeles || 11–49–10
|- align="center"
| 71 || 24 || St. Louis Blues || 0–4 || Los Angeles || 11–50–10
|- align="center"
| 72 || 26 || Philadelphia Flyers || 3–2 || Los Angeles || 12–50-10
|- align="center"
| 73 || 28 || Minnesota North Stars || 4–2 || Los Angeles || 13–50-10
|- align="center"
| 74 || 31 || Minnesota North Stars || 2–5 || Minnesota || 13–51–10
|-

|- align="center"
| 75 || 3 || Oakland Seals || 1–4 || Oakland || 13–52–10
|- align="center"
| 76 || 4 || Oakland Seals || 4–1 || Los Angeles || 14–52-10
|-

Playoffs
For the first time in team history, the Kings failed to qualify for the playoffs.

Player statistics
Note: GP = Games played; G = Goals; A = Assists; Pts = Points; PIM = Penalty minutes

Goaltending
Note: GP = Games played; MIN = Minutes; W = Wins; L = Losses; T = Ties; SO = Shutouts; GAA = Goals against average

Awards and records

Records

Milestones

Transactions
The Kings were involved in the following transactions during the 1969–70 season.

Trades

Free agent signings

Intra-league Draft

Reverse Draft

Draft picks

NOTE: Back before 1979, the amateur draft was held with varying rules and procedures. In 1969, teams only needed to select as many player as they wanted to, which is why there were only four Kings players drafted.

References
 Kings on Hockey Database

Los Angeles Kings seasons
Los
Los
1969 in sports in California
Los